Yağızer Hamdi Uluğ (born April 28, 1972 in İzmir, Turkey) is a Turkish professional basketball coach who currently serves as a head coach of Beşiktaş Sompo Japan.

External links
 Eurocup Profile

1972 births
Living people
Turkish basketball coaches